It's Smoke Time is the only studio album by the British psychedelic pop band The Smoke, released in early 1967, originally by German label Metronome Records only in Germany.

It features the hit single “My Friend Jack”, number two on the German charts.

Track listing 
All songs written by The Smoke, except where indicated:

LP Side A 
"My Friend Jack" - 3:03
"Waterfall" - 2:41
"You Can't Catch Me" - 3:17
"High in a Room" - 3:00
"Wake Up Cherylina" - 2:19
"Don't Lead Me On" (Jerry Reno, Terry Brown) - 2:17

LP Side B 
We Can Take It	- 2:43
"If the Weather's Sunny" - 2:50
"I Wanna Make It with You" - 3:10
"It's Getting Closer" - 2:33
 "It's Just Your Way of Lovin'" - 2:25
"I Would If I Could But I Can't" - 2:14

Bonus tracks (only CD release) 
"Have Some More Tea (Greg Ridley) - 2:13
"Victor Henry's Cool Book" - 2:28
"Sydney Gill" - 3:32
"It Could Be Wonderful" (Jimmy Miller) - 2:18
"Keep a Hold of What You've Got" (A. Maldon) - 2:06
"She's a Liar" (A. Maldon) - 2:21
"I Am Only Dreaming" -  1:59		
"Universal Vagrant" (Bob Feldman, Jerry Goldstein, Richard Gottehrer, Wes Farrell) - 2:53		
"Dreams of Dreams" (Chapman, Vaughan, Williams) - 2:31		
"My Birth" (Francis) - 2:41		
"Jack Is Back" (Danny Beckerman) - 3:18		
"That's What I Want" (Wil Malone) - 2:25		
"Playing with Magic" (W. Malone) - 3:07		
"My Friend Jack (Alternate Take)" - 3:10

Personnel

The Smoke 
 Mick Rowley – Vocals, Guitar [With Two Fingers]
 Mal Luker - Guitar, Keyboards, Sitar
Zeke Lund –Bass
Geoff Gill - Drums

Additional personnel 
Supervised By – Monty Babson
Performer, Primary Artist - Shotstar
Liner Notes – Mark Brennan

References

External links 
It's Smoke Time at Discogs
It's Smoke Time at Allmusic

1967 albums
The Smoke albums